16, stylized as -(16)-, is an American sludge metal band from Los Angeles, California. The band is currently signed to Relapse Records. -(16)- has been cited, along with fellow pioneering acts such as Eyehategod, Crowbar and Acid Bath, as one of the subgenre's seminal outfits. In June 2020, the band released their eighth full-length album, Dream Squasher.

History

Formation and Curves That Kick (1992–1994)
16 was formed in Santa Ana, California by Bobby Ferry (guitar), Cris Jerue (vocals), Ben Clark (bass) and Jason Corley (drums) in 1992. According to Ferry, he and Jerue bonded as part of the Southern California skate scene. Ferry has stated band was originally called 15, but changed their name when they were made aware of a previously existing group called Fifteen, who had been signed to Lookout Records. Ferry also named some of the band's early influences, including 7 Seconds, Bad Brains, and Metallica, as well as the "wave of [Amphetamine Reptile] bands, Helmet, Jesus Lizard, Unsane and Tar." The band's first full-length album, Curves That Kick, was released in 1993 on Bacteria Sour, an independent label owned by renowned artist, Pushead. Tony Baumeister joined the band as the permanent bass player in 1993, shortly before CTK was released.  Following the album's release, the summer of 1994 saw -(16)- tour Japan, and then return home to play select dates as main support for Slayer.

Drop Out and Blaze of Incompetence (1995–1998) 
The band's next record, Drop Out, was released by Pessimiser/Theologian records in 1996 (after being shelved for nearly two years). In spite of Drop Outs critical acclaim, -(16)- did not tour heavily, opting instead to focus on performing locally. Jason Corley was ejected from the band at the end of 1994, and replaced by Andy Hassler. Phil Vera was also added as a second guitarist. The band released Blaze of Incompetence in 1997 (again on Pessimiser/Theologian), and did a US tour with Grief in 1998. Andy Hassler was fired shortly after the tour. R.D. Davies replaced Andy, and then he was replaced by Mark Sanger 6 months later.

Zoloft Smile and hiatus (1999–2004) 
16's next album, Zoloft Smile, was recorded in 1999/2000, but was not released until 2002 by At A Loss Recordings. By the time the album was released, Bobby and Tony had both quit the band. The rest of the guys carried on with Phil being the lone guitar player. Nial McGaughey and later, Rafa Martinez handled bass duties. Phil took over vocal duties in 2003, after Cris was forced to go to rehab for alcohol and drug dependency. Addiction issues have plagued the band throughout their career, with Jerue remarking in a 2012 interview with Invisible Oranges, "there have been 14 dudes in this band and not one has been stable mentally or chemically." The band then toured the US and Japan as a three-piece (Phil, Mark, Rafa), until calling it quits in 2004.

Reformation, Bridges to Burn, and Deep Cuts from Dark Clouds (2007–2014) 
Ferry, Jerue, Corley and Baumeister reformed -(16)- in 2007, subsequently securing a deal with Relapse Records. Their Relapse debut, Bridges to Burn, was released in January 2009. The band parted ways with Corley again, and recruited Mateo Pinkerton as their new drummer. In 2010, Relapse Records released The First Trimester, a compilation of non-album material (primarily recorded in 1992-93). Deep Cuts from Dark Clouds followed in 2012. In 2012, Last Hurrah Records also released Lost Tracts of Time, a compilation featuring b-sides from the Zoloft Smile era.

The Lifespan of a Moth and Dream Squasher (2015–present) 
On May 18, 2016, Stereogum premiered a new track from Lifespan of a Moth, "The Absolute Center of a Pitch Black Heart".

On June 9, 2016, Decibel premiered 16's video for "Peaches, Cream and The Placenta". Guitarist Bobby Ferry said of the track, "The song is a stressed-out walk down a well-trodden trail that we have been prancing down since the early '90s. The lyrics delicately touch with all thumbs on the subject of addictive personality sorcery that creates unintended helpless victims." The video was directed by longtime 16 collaborator and producer, Jeff Forrest.

In June 2016, it was announced that "Landloper" was the opening track from Lifespan of a Moth.

On August 15, 2016, guitarist Bobby Ferry discussed Lifespan of a Moth on the Everything Went Black podcast, hosted by Tombs frontman Mike Hill.

In 2020, a brand new album, entitled Dream Squasher was announced for release on June 5. Ferry undertook the vocal duties, as Cris Jerue retired from the music industry.

Personnel

Current members
 Bobby Ferry – guitar, vocals (1991–2000, 2007–present)
 Barney Firks – bass (2013–present)
 Dion Thurman – drums (2013–present)
 Alex Shuster – guitar (2017–present)

Former members 
 Jason Corley – drums (1991–1995, 2007–2009)
 Cris Jerue – vocals (1991–2002, 2007–2020)
 Benji Clark – bass (1991–1992)
 Greg Burkhart – bass (1992)
 Mike Morris – bass (1992–1993)
 Tony Baumeister – bass (1993–2002, 2007–2013)
 Andy Hassler – drums (1995–1998)
 Phil Vera – guitar, vocals (1995–2004)
 R.D. Davies – drums (1998–1999)
 Mark Sanger – drums (1999–2004)
 Nial Mcgaughey – bass (2002–2003)
 Rafael Martinez – bass (2003–2004)
 Mateo Pinkerton – drums (2009–2013)

Timeline

Discography

Studio albums
 Curves That Kick (Bacteria Sour, 1993)
 Drop Out (Theologian Records, 1996)
 Blaze of Incompetence (Pessimiser, 1997)
 Zoloft Smile (At a Loss Records, 2003)
 Bridges to Burn (Relapse, 2009)
 Deep Cuts from Dark Clouds (Relapse, 2012)
 Lifespan of a Moth (Relapse, 2016)
 Dream Squasher (Relapse, 2020)
 Into Dust (Relapse, 2022)

Singles and extended plays
 Doorprize (Reverb Recordings, 1992)
 Japanese Tour (Pushead Fanclub, 1993)
 Wash Me (Pushead Fanclub, 1993)
 Sail Rabbit (Standard, 1993)
 Crystal (Pushead Fanclub, 1993)
 Split with The American Psycho Band (No Lie, 1994)
 Apollo Creed split with Fresh American Lamb (Theologian Records, 1994)
 Trigger Happy / Pessimiser split with Grief (Pessimiser, 1994)
 Preoccupied (Bacteria Sour, 1994)
 Felicia (Bacteria Sour, 1994)
 Tocohara (Bacteria Sour, 1995)
 The Good, the Bad and the Ugly: The Bad (Disc 2) split with Toadliquor, Floor, Cavity, Thug (Insolito, 1998)
 Bored / At Dawn They Sleep split with Grief (Pessimiser, 1998)
 Fortune & Flames (MP3.com, 2000)
 Zodiac Dreaming split with Today Is the Day (Trash Art!, 2001)
 Lost Tracts of Time (Last Hurrah Records, 2012)

Compilations
 Scott Case: Out of Print Material (Pessimiser/Theologian, 1998)
 The First Trimester (Relapse Records, 2010)

Videos
 Damone (independent, 2000)

References

External links
 Bandcamp
 Official Relapse Records website
 

Heavy metal musical groups from California
Musical groups established in 1992
Musical groups from Los Angeles
American sludge metal musical groups